The Bushbaby is a 1969 American film based on the novel The Bushbabies (1965) by William Stevenson and adapted by Robert Maxwell. It was directed and produced by John Trent and stars Margaret Brooks and Lou Gossett in the leading roles, also starring Donald Houston and Laurence Naismith.

The film tells an episode in the life of Jackie Leeds, daughter of John Leeds. When the African country in which they reside, Kenya, declares its independence, John Leeds assumes that he has lost his job and must leave for London with his daughter. This proves difficult for Jackie, who is convinced that she belongs in Kenya, especially after their friend Tembo presents her with a pet bushbaby that she names 'Komba', which she will have to return to its natural habitat prior to leaving.

The film was the first adaptation of the book The Bushbabies by William Stevenson. Decades later, in 1992, the story was adapted for television as an anime series belonging to the World Masterpiece Theater from Nippon Animation. The series received the international English title of The Bush Baby (大草原の小さな天使　ブッシュベイビー, Sougen no chiisana tenshi busshu beibii).

Plot 
One night in the Kenyan grasslands, Jackie Leeds and her family's native friend and servant, Tembo Murumbi, chase a young galago about its preferred habitat, a baobab tree. Tembo catches the small animal and offers it to Jackie as a gift; she names the small bushbaby 'Komba'. A year or so passes since this first encounter, and one day at church, Komba's playfulness causes commotion, disrupting the daily hymn. Feeling defeated, the pastor yields the podium to Professor Crankshaw, who takes the opportunity to bid farewell to a number of church members. Jackie notices that Crankshaw, 'Cranky' as she calls him, looks firmly into her father's eyes as he speaks, and she becomes alarmed. After church, Jackie's suspicions are confirmed when her father explains that, due to the new powers in Kenya's government, his employment as a game warden is likely to be terminated. They'll leave for London where he'll fill an opening at the zoo. Jackie is upset at the news, especially when she learns that Komba will have to be left behind. For Jackie, leaving Africa means leaving the home she's known all of her life: her school, her friends, and the grave of her mother, Penelope Leeds, who had been killed in the uprising of 1961.

Cast 
 Margaret Brooks – Jacqueline 'Jackie' Leeds
 Louis Gossett – Tembo Murumbi
 Donald Houston – John Leeds
 Laurence Naismith – Professor 'Cranky' Crankshaw
 Marne Maitland – Hadj
 Geoffrey Bayldon – Tilison
 Jack Gwillim – Ardsley
 Noel Howlett – Reverend Barlow
 Tommy Ansah – policeman
 Jumoke Debayo – bus woman
 Harold Goodwin – Steward Bertie
 Charles Hyatt – Gideon
 Willie Johah – police sergeant
 Simon Lack – first officer
 Victor Maddern – barman
 Ellario Pedro – policeman
 Martin Wyldeck – captain
 Sid Hunt – second officer
 Mohinder Singh Matharoo – Sikh policeman
 Johan Mkopi – police constable
 Kasesa Mayega – elephant poacher

Home media
The Bushbaby was released on home video on 18 August 1993.

See also
 List of American films of 1969
William Stevenson
The Bushbabies (1965)
The Bush Baby (1992)

References

External links
 
 

1969 films
1960s children's adventure films
American children's adventure films
Films based on Canadian novels
Metro-Goldwyn-Mayer films
Swahili-language films
Films about primates
Films set in Kenya
Films directed by John Trent (director)
Films shot at MGM-British Studios
1960s English-language films
1960s American films
1960s multilingual films
American multilingual films